This article contains titles of books in the saddle club series. a children's book series authored by bonnie bryant, as well as a spin-off series.  The books were later adapted into an Australian television series, also titled The Saddle Club.

These books can be read for free onhttps://openlibrary.organisation

The Saddle Club
This is a middle-grade series focusing on Carole Hanson, Stevie Lake, and Lisa Atwood.
 Horse Crazy (6/28/1988)
 Horse Shy (10/1/1988)
 Horse Sense (1/1/1989)
 Horse Power (1/1/1989)
 Trail Mates (1/1/1989)
 Dude Ranch (1/1/1989)
 Horse Play (1/1/1989)
 Horse Show (12/1/1989)
 Hoof Beat (1/1/1990)
 Riding Camp (1/1/1990)
 Horse Wise (1/1/1990)
 Rodeo Rider (9/1/1990)
 Starlight Christmas (10/1/1990)
 Sea Horse (12/1/1990)
 Team Play (1/1/1991)
 Horse Games (1/1/1991)
 Horsenapped! (1/1/1991)
 Pack Trip (1/1/1991)
 Star Rider (1/1/1991)
 Snow Ride (1/1/1992)
 Racehorse (1/1/1992)
 Fox Hunt (1/1/1992)
 Horse Trouble (1/1/1992)
 Ghost Rider (1/1/1992)
 Show Horse (1/1/1992)
 Beach Ride (1/1/1993)
 Bridle Path (1/1/1993)
 Stable Manners (1/1/1993)
 Ranch Hands (1/1/1993)
 Autumn Trail (1/1/1993)
 Hayride (1/1/1993)
 Chocolate Horse(1/1/1994)
 High Horse (1/1/1994)
 Hay Fever (1/1/1994)
 Horse Tale (1/1/1994)
 Riding Lesson (1/1/1994)
 Stage Coach (1/1/1994)
 Horse Trade(1/1/1994)
 Purebred (1/1/1994)
 Gift Horse (1/1/1994)
 Stable Witch (1/1/1995)
 Saddlebags (1/1/1995)
 Photo Finish (1/1/1995)
 Horseshoe (1/1/1995)
 Stable Groom (1/1/1995)
 Flying Horse (1/1/1995)
 Horse Magic (1/1/1995)
 Mystery Ride (1/1/1995)
 Stable Farewell (1/1/1995)
 Yankee Swap (1/1/1995)
 Pleasure Horse (1/1/1996)
 Riding Class (1/1/1996)
 Horse Sitters (1/1/1996)
 Gold Medal Rider (1/1/1996)
 Gold Medal Horse (1/1/1996)
 Cutting Horse (1/1/1996)
 Tight Rein (1/1/1996)
 Wild Horses (1/1/1996)
 Phantom Horse (1/1/1996)
 Hobby Horse (1/1/1996)
 Broken Horse (1/1/1996)
 Horse Blues (12/1/1996)
 Stable Hearts (1/1/1997)
 Horse Capades (2/10/1997)
 Silver Stirrups (3/10/1997)
 Saddle Sore (5/12/1997)
 Summer Horse (6/9/1997)
 Summer Rider (6/9/1997)
 Endurance Ride (7/7/1997)
 Horse Race (8/11/1997)
 Horse Talk (10/6/1997)
 Holiday Horse (11/10/1997)
 Horse Guest (12/1/1997)
 Horse Whispers (1/9/1998)
 Painted Horse (2/9/1998)
 Horse Care (3/3/1998)
 Rocking Horse (4/6/1998)
 Horseflies (5/11/1998)
 English Horse (6/8/1998)
 English Rider (6/8/1998)
 Wagon Trail (7/6/1998)
 Quarter Horse (8/10/1998)
 Horse Thief (9/8/1998)
 Schooling Horse (10/13/1998)
 Horse Fever (12/1/1998)
 Secret Horse (1/1/1999)
 Show Jumper (1/1/1999)
 Sidesaddle (6/8/1999)
 Lucky Horse (8/10/1999)
 Driving Team (1/11/2000)
 Starting Gate (3/1/2000)
 Million Dollar Horse (5/9/2000)
 Horse Love (7/11/2000)
 Horse Spy (9/12/2000)
 Show Judge (11/14/2000)
 New Rider (1/9/2001)
 Hard Hat (3/13/2001)
 Horse Feathers (5/8/2001)
 Trail Ride (7/10/2001)
 Stray Horse (9/11/2001)
 Best Friends (11/13/2001)

Saddle Club Super Editions
 A Summer Without Horses" (1/1/1994)The Secret of the Stallion (1/1/1995)
 Western Star (1/1/1995)
 Dream Horse (1/1/1996)
 Before They Rode Horses (4/7/1997)
 Nightmare (9/8/1997)
 Christmas Treasures (11/10/1998)

Inside Stories
 Stevie:  The Inside Story (1/12/1999)
 Lisa:  The Inside Story (6/8/1999)
 Carole:  The Inside Story (10/12/1999)

Peripherals
 Just For Girls:  The Saddle Club: Happy Horse Day (1/1/1990)
This book also included a short story in the Fabulous Five series by Betsy Haynes.

Pony Tails
The first spin-off is a series of chapter books focusing on May Grover, Jasmine James, and Corey Takamura.

 Pony Crazy (6/1/1995)
 May's Riding Lesson (6/1/1995)
 Corey's Pony Is Missing (8/1/1995)
 Jasmine's Christmas Ride (10/1/1995)
 May Takes the Lead (12/1/1995)
 Corey in the Saddle (2/1/1996)
 Jasmine Trots Ahead (4/1/1996)
 May Rides a New Pony (6/1/1996) 
 Corey and the Spooky Pony (8/5/1996)
 Jasmine Helps a Foal (10/1/1996)
 May Goes to England (4/7/1997)
 Corey's Secret Friend (5/12/1997)
 Jasmine's First Horse Show (7/7/1997)
 May's Runaway Ride (9/8/1997)
 Corey's Christmas Wish (11/10/1997)
 Jasmine and the Jumping Pony (1/12/1998)

Pine Hollow
The second spin-off is a series of young adult books focusing on Carole Hanson, Stevie Lake, and Lisa Atwood approximately four years after the events of The Saddle Club series.
 The Long Ride (7/6/1998)
 The Trail Home (9/8/1998)
 Reining In (11/10/1998)
 Changing Leads (1/12/1999)
 Conformation Faults (1/5/1999)
 Shying at Trouble (1/12/1999)
 Penalty Points (7/13/1999)
 Course of Action(9/7/1999)
 Riding to Win (11/9/1999)
 Ground Training (2/1/2000)
 Cross Ties (4/11/2000)
 Back In The Saddle (6/13/2000)
 High Stakes (8/8/2000)
 Headstrong (10/10/2000)
 Setting the Pace (12/12/2000)
 Track Record (2/13/2001)
 Full Gallop (4/10/2001)

References

Lists of children's books